Eugen Dasović (1 December 1896 – 7 February 1980) was a Croatian footballer. He competed in the men's tournament at the 1924 Summer Olympics.

International career
He made his debut for Yugoslavia in a June 1923 friendly match away against Poland and earned a total of 10 caps, scoring no goals. His final international was an October 1927 friendly against Czechoslovakia.

References

External links
 

1896 births
1980 deaths
People from Slatina, Croatia
Association football fullbacks
Yugoslav footballers
Yugoslavia international footballers
Olympic footballers of Yugoslavia
Footballers at the 1924 Summer Olympics
HAŠK players
DFC Prag players
HŠK Građanski Zagreb players
Yugoslav expatriate footballers
Expatriate footballers in Czechoslovakia
Yugoslav expatriate sportspeople in Czechoslovakia